This is a list of the tie-in comics to Hasbro's My Little Pony: Friendship Is Magic as issued by IDW Publishing. See My Little Pony (IDW Publishing) for more information.

In addition to monthly single issue releases, IDW has also published collected volumes covering the individual story arcs, multiple story arcs, or larger portions of the series.

My Little Pony: Friendship Is Magic (November 2012–October 2021)

This is a list of My Little Pony: Friendship Is Magic issues.

My Little Pony: Micro-series (February–December 2013)

This is a list of My Little Pony: Micro-series issues.

My Little Pony: Friends Forever (January 2014–April 2017)

This is a list of My Little Pony: Friends Forever issues.

My Little Pony: FIENDship is Magic (April 2015)
This is a list of My Little Pony: FIENDship is Magic issues.

My Little Pony: Legends of Magic (April 2017–March 2018) 

This is a list of My Little Pony: Legends of Magic issues.

My Little Pony: The Movie Prequel (June–September 2017) 
This is a list of My Little Pony: The Movie Prequel issues.

My Little Pony: Ponyville Mysteries (May–September 2018) 

This is a list of My Little Pony: Ponyville Mysteries issues.

My Little Pony: Nightmare Knights (October 2018–March 2019) 

This is a list of My Little Pony: Nightmare Knights issues.

My Little Pony: Spirit of the Forest (May–August 2019)

This is a list of My Little Pony: Spirit of the Forest issues.

My Little Pony: Feats of Friendship (August–November 2019)

This is a list of My Little Pony: Feats of Friendship issues.

My Little Pony: Generations (October 2021–February 2022)

This is a list of My Little Pony: Generations issues.

My Little Pony Classics Reimagined: Little Fillies (November 2022–February 2023)

This is a list of My Little Pony Classics Reimagined: Little Fillies issues.

One-shots

This is a list of My Little Pony one-shots.

References

My Little Pony comics